Marie-France Lorho (born 15 December 1964) is a French politician serving as the member of the National Assembly for the 4th constituency of Vaucluse since 2017. A member of the League of the South (LS), she is currently its sole representative in Parliament.

Career
The daughter of General Raymond Lorho (1924–2014), Marie-France Lorho was active in local politics in Orange prior to her tenure in the National Assembly. She is close to Mayor Jacques Bompard and was his substitute in the 2017 legislative election. Following Bompard's resignation to focus on his mayorship, Lorho became a parliamentarian.

In February 2018, alongside Emmanuelle Ménard, she proposed a bill which would recognise the 1790s killings in Vendée by troops under the command of the National Convention as war crimes, crimes against humanity and genocide.

She stood for re-election in the 2022 French legislative election, with support from National Rally. She was elected in the second round over the Ensemble Citoyens candidate.

References 

1964 births
Living people
People from Colmar
League of the South (France) politicians
Politicians from Provence-Alpes-Côte d'Azur
21st-century French politicians
21st-century French women politicians
Deputies of the 15th National Assembly of the French Fifth Republic
Deputies of the 16th National Assembly of the French Fifth Republic